Miniature Pigs, also called mini pig, or American Mini Pig. Pygmy pig, are small breeds of domestic pig, such as the Vietnamese Pot-Bellied pig, Göttingen minipig, Juliana pig, Choctaw hog, or Kunekune (and specimens derived by crossbreeding these breeds). Miniature pigs can usually be distinguished from other pigs by their pot belly, a swayed back, a chubby figure, a rounded head, a short snout, short legs, a short neck, and a tail with thick hair at the end.

History
In the 1960s, Chinese pigs that grew to be  were sent to zoos in Western cities and were used for medical research in the fields of toxicology, pharmacology, pulmonology, cardiology, aging, and as a source of organs for organ transplantation.

In the mid-1980s, Keith Connell of the Bowmanville Zoo in Ontario imported breeding Vietnamese Pot-Bellied pigs to Canada, which became the foundation for the pot-bellied pig in North America. The breed is known for its small stature, swayed back, and pronounced pot belly. Because of custom laws, only their offspring could be sold in the United States. U.S. zoos were the main target for the piglets, but private owners soon began purchasing them as pets. Pet pot-bellied pigs started to appear everywhere; from New York apartment complexes to small suburban residences. Up to five additional imports were made in the following 10 years. To track the pedigrees, the Potbellied Pig Registry Service, Inc (PPRSI) was created to preserve these bloodlines and establish a breed registry in the United States. This registry was dissolved in the late 1990s. Today, most pot-bellied pigs are little to never purebred, as the pure breed is critically endangered.

All of the foundation pigs were dual registered in the PPRSI and MPPRSI.

Beginning in the late 1960s at the Institute of Animal Breeding and Genetics (Institut für Tierzucht und Haustiergenetik) at the University of Göttingen, Germany, the Göttingen minipig was developed by crossbreeding the Minnesota minipig, the Vietnamese Pot-Bellied pig and the German Landrace pig. It is considered the smallest breed of domestic pig in the world.

Medical research
Miniature pigs have been used for medical research, including toxicology, pharmacology, experimental surgery, pulmonology, cardiology, xenotransplantation, orthopedic procedures and aging studies. Mini pigs are mainly used for biochemical, anatomical, and physiological similarities to humans. They are also quick to develop, making it easier to breed and have more genomic background compared to other animal models of toxicology. Today, more than 60,000 pigs are used for scientific research. For example, scientists are working on studying the possibility of utilizing pig hearts for human heart organ transplants, and work has been done to genetically modify the tissues of pigs to be accepted by the human immune system.

As pets

Miniature pigs are commonly kept as pets. 
Realistic sizes of pigs vary from pig to pig; genetics drives the growth, along with appropriate nutrition and care. Domesticated miniature pigs can vary from 75 lbs to 200lbs.  About Micro Pigs and their size - UK</ref> However, since pigs can breed years before they fully mature, unscrupulous or ignorant breeders may show off parent pigs which are not fully grown themselves, so have not reached their full adult size.

Domesticated pigs are often trained to urinate and defecate in litter boxes, which they learn very quickly. Typically, pine pellets or pine shreds are used. They also can be trained on dog pee pads. They can also be trained to ring a bell by a door when they need to go outside.

In the U.S. as well as Canada, laws may vary on if a pet pig can be kept, depending on the location. If there are no laws regarding pet pigs, some areas may consider a pig to be exclusively known as livestock; some towns and cities have ordinances disallowing farm animals within city limits. However, one can petition city councils and have outdated ordinances amended before a pig is introduced into a household, since many ordinances were put into place before the pot-bellied pig was even introduced to the U.S.

Pig therapy
Pigs have been used in various types of animal-assisted therapy to perform duties in facilities including airports, hospitals, nursing homes, and special-needs schools, or as emotional support animals for individuals with conditions such as autism or anxiety and veterans with PTSD. Two well-known miniature pigs named Thunder and Bolt trained by children to certified animal therapy status have been put to work in a number of nursing homes, schools and a hospital.

Other notable references
A Yucatan miniature pig is the unofficial mascot of the Animal Rescue League of Boston.

It is a critically endangered wild species, not appropriate for domestication.

See also
Wuzhishan pig

References

Mammals as pets
Pig breeds originating in Canada